Players and pairs who neither have high enough rankings nor receive wild cards may participate in a qualifying tournament held one week before the annual Wimbledon Tennis Championships.

Seeds

  Maria Kirilenko /  Flavia Pennetta (qualified)
  Raquel Kops-Jones /  Abigail Spears (qualified)
  Alina Jidkova /  Lilia Osterloh (qualifying competition)
  Melinda Czink /  İpek Şenoğlu (first round)
  Christina Fusano /  Angela Haynes (qualifying competition, lucky losers)
  Ayumi Morita /  Junri Namigata (qualifying competition, lucky losers)
  Jorgelina Cravero /  Betina Jozami (qualified)
  Maret Ani /  Séverine Bremond (first round)

Qualifiers

  Maria Kirilenko /  Flavia Pennetta
  Raquel Kops-Jones /  Abigail Spears
  Jorgelina Cravero /  Betina Jozami
  Andrea Hlaváčková /  Olga Savchuk

Lucky losers

  Christina Fusano /  Angela Haynes
  Ayumi Morita /  Junri Namigata
  Anna Smith /  Georgie Stoop

Qualifying draw

First qualifier

Second qualifier

Third qualifier

Fourth qualifier

External links

2008 Wimbledon Championships on WTAtennis.com
2008 Wimbledon Championships – Women's draws and results at the International Tennis Federation

Women's Doubles Qualifying
Wimbledon Championship by year – Women's doubles qualifying
Wimbledon Championships